Dominik Doleschal (born 9 May 1989) is an Austrian professional association footballer who plays for Austrian Football Second League side SV Oberwart. He plays as a midfielder.

Career

Wiener Neustadt
In February 2019, Doleschal joined SC Wiener Neustadt.

SV Oberwart
Five months after his arrival to SC Wiener Neustadt, he left the club and joined SV Oberwart.

References

External links
 

1989 births
Living people
Austrian footballers
Association football midfielders
SV Mattersburg players
SC Wiener Neustadt players
Austrian Football Bundesliga players
2. Liga (Austria) players
People from Oberwart
Footballers from Burgenland